The Spokane Police Department is the agency responsible for law enforcement in Spokane, Washington. As of 2015, the department had 310 sworn officers. Craig Meidl is the current Chief. The department was founded in 1881.

References

Municipal police departments of Washington (state)
Government of Spokane, Washington